A  is in Sweden and Finland a seated meal held within a set time frame. In restaurants it may refer to a seating, i.e. the time given for a crowd to have their meal. The term is also used to denote the part of a party that is a seated meal. Though it can refer to any kind of meal, it is often used to refer to a student .

Student sittning
A student  in Sweden or Finland is usually a dinner had at the student union's or nation's property, usually a pub room, or banquet hall if the student union is fortunate enough to have one. In academic environments some of the tradition is carried on even after one is no longer a student.

Dress code
The dress code is different depending on the occasion; everything from white tie to student boilersuit can be the evening's dress code. s often have themes, and the guests are encouraged to dress to match the theme.

The meal and drinks
The meal is prepared and served by students who often spend some time working at their union or nation. The number of dishes vary, but three courses is common, and alcohol is usually included in the price (beer or cider and snaps along with punsch). If snaps or punsch is not included, there will often be tickets for sale.

Singing
These songs differ depending on student union or nation. The songs may range from traditional to pop music, depending on the formality of the occasion. If there is a theme for the evening, it is possible to write new lyrics to existing songs based on it. During the last verse of the song, the guests stand on their chairs and after the song is finished one is no longer supposed to sit down.

During Finnish-language , many of the classic Swedish drinking songs are also sung in Swedish or in translated versions. In more formal , academic and patriotic songs, such as De Brevitate Vitae, Finlandia Hymn and the Jäger March are sung.

Toasts
Many places in Sweden and Finland have an etiquette concerning how to toast. In Uppsala, for example, the tradition is usually to raise a glass and to nod first to one's table partner (for ladies, the gentleman to the left, and for gentlemen, the lady to the right), then with the next person who is not one's table partner, and lastly with the person sitting across the table. After the three nods, one drinks and then nods to the same people in the reverse order. Finally, the glass is set back down on the table (ladies first). During some s this begins very formally but then becomes more and more relaxed.

Seating
Often s will involve sitting at long tables (in Swedish). In some cases, the guests will be designated seats (in Finnish), if possible every other lady and gentleman, and shifted on opposite sides of the table so that the ladies will sit opposite a gentleman, and vice versa.

Other entertainment

Toastmaster
The toastmaster keeps note of and introduces everyone who wants to perform something, communicates with the serving staff, and generally makes sure that the  runs smoothly. The  chooses which songs to sing and starts them off.

Differing traditions
Strangely, when Swedish students from different  traditions meet they will often find each other's traditions quite remarkable, even absurd.

In Finland, breaking the code of the evening may result in a punishment for the person(s) in question. The punishment is usually decided by the toastmaster or song master. The people punished must, for example, sing a song in front of others. There are varying attitudes towards this custom and in some places it has been abolished.

Gask and ball
Usually there is dancing, either to live music or a DJ, and a pub. Formal etiquette suggests that a gentleman at a ball with a  should dance the two first dances with his table partner (the lady on the right), the following two dances with the lady who was on his left, and finally two dances with the lady sitting across from him.

Notes

Academic meals
Eating parties
Finnish culture
Swedish cuisine
Swedish words and phrases